Jafarian (also Romanized as Ja‘farīān) is a village in Baranduz Rural District, in the Central District of Urmia County, West Azerbaijan Province, Iran. At the 2006 census, its population was 169, in 29 families.

References 

Populated places in Urmia County